The Mentawai squirrel (Callosciurus melanogaster) is a species of rodent in the family Sciuridae.
It is one of 20 or so species endemic to the Mentawai Islands off the west coast of Sumatra. There are three subspecies: C. m. melanogaster, C. m. mentawi, and C. m. atratus. This small isolated population is listed as "Vulnerable" by the IUCN due to habitat loss.

References

Callosciurus
Mammals of Indonesia
Mammals described in 1895
Taxa named by Oldfield Thomas
Taxonomy articles created by Polbot